Ragtime was one of the world's fastest yachts in the 1970s. In 1973, Ragtime became famous for beating the favorite, Windward Passage by four minutes, 31 seconds, in the Transpacific Yacht Race from Los Angeles to Honolulu. It also competed successfully in the Sydney to Hobart yacht race

The boat's designer was John Spencer from New Zealand.
Built in 1963 it was then owned by Tom Clark and named Infidel. The subsequent owner changed the name to Ragtime.

Pat Farrah retrofitted Ragtime in the 1990s to allow it to continue competing in the Transpac.

It finished 10th in the 2006 Newport to Ensenada International Yacht Race.

References

Individual sailing vessels
1960s sailing yachts
Sailing yachts of New Zealand
Sailing yachts built in New Zealand